Daventry Town F.C. is a football club based in the town of Daventry, Northamptonshire, England, formed in 1886.

History
The club was established in 1886 as a local-town club playing in the Northampton Town League.  The club moved to the Northants Combination in 1987, and their emergence began under manager Willie Barrett, who led the club to successive championships in the Combination First and Premier divisions. In 1989–90, the club joined the United Counties League Division One. Since joining the United Counties League, they have won promotion to the Premier Division on three occasions, but have also been relegated twice.

The club started at The Hollow Ground in the town, but having won promotion at the first attempt were denied because their new Elderstubbs ground was not ready in time. Their manager left, and the fortunes of the club declined with relegation alternating with promotion.

The club was threatened with extinction in 2005–06, when the Elderstubbs clubhouse and changing rooms were destroyed by fire.  However, a sponsorship deal with mobile phone company Go Mobile enabled the club to survive.

2007–08 was a very successful season for Daventry Town. They won UCL Division One, losing just once, and defeated three Premier division teams en route to the League Knockout Cup final, where they were defeated by Desborough Town 3–2.

In the 2009–10 season Daventry won promotion to the Southern League Division One Central, by becoming champions of the United Counties League under the guidance of manager Darren Foster.

2010–2011, Fuller's Town finished 3rd in their first season in the Southern League Division One Central losing to Hitchin Town 2–0 in the play off final in front of a crowd of 1048.

Prior to the start of the 2011–2012 Mark Kinsella was brought in and Ady Fuller moved on to become manager of Banbury United. A majority of Fuller's team moved elsewhere. Over 40 players wore the purple shirt during the season and not surprisingly the team struggled to find any consistency until the end of the season.

During the 2011–2012, local rivals Daventry United folded and their Manager Darran Foster moved to Daventry Town as  Mark Kinsella's Assistant. However, Kinsella was relieved of his duties shortly afterwards and Foster took charge of team affairs.  In Foster's first season, 2012–2013, Town finished a highly respectable 8th in the table.

With a majority of the players remaining at the club for the 2013–14 season, the team made an incredible start to the campaign, winning their first 7 matches in the league whilst also qualifying for the FA Cup first round proper for the first time in their history. They were drawn away to Chesterfield from Football League Two, and ended up losing the tie 2–0.

After the playing budget was cut, manager Darran Foster resigned in early November 2014. Daventry then appointed ex Watford striker Allan Smart as his replacement.

However, in June 2015, Iain Humphrey resigned as chairman and was replaced by Allan Smart, who relinquished his role as Daventry Town's manager in the process.

Ady Fuller, who had served as Smart's assistant and had a previous spell as Daventry Town boss as well as stints as manager at Banbury United and Bedworth United, was appointed as caretaker manager in the interim period in June 2015.

However, Humphrey would make a U-turn and return as chairman just a month later, in July 2015, replacing Smart and caretaker manager Fuller who both left the club altogether. His first move was to re-appoint former manager Darran Foster who had left the club in November 2014. Foster had only just been appointed manager at Woodford United in June 2015.

Foster resigned in April 2016 following a 5 0 home defeat to Kidsgrove Athletic.

Club Goalkeeping Coach Derren Midson and the club's Juniors Development Officer Pete Flockhart stepped in as Caretaker Managers with Brian Porter returning as Club Secretary to ensure the club somehow completed their remaining 6 fixtures of the 2015/2016 season.

In May 2016, Daventry Town resigned from the Northern Premier League due to financial problems and were later placed in the United Counties League Division One, step 9 of English football for the 2016–17 season. Ian Humphrey resigned and handed over full control to a New Executive Committee. Local businessman Steve Tubb took over as chairman.

In May 2016, Woodford United Player Manager Arron Parkinson and Ex-Cogenhoe United Manager Andy Marks were confirmed as Joint Managers for season 2016–17.

In April 2017, Daventry Town won the UCL Division One in their first season back at this level, going undefeated at home. They were promoted to the United Counties Premier Division.

Following Andy Marks's decision to step down as Joint Manager, Ian King was appointed Joint Manager alongside Arron Parkinson.

In May 2018, Daventry Town won the Buckingham Charity Cup beating Buckingham Athletic 2 0 in the final.

In June 2018, Ian King resigned so he could find a position in the professional game. Arron Parkinson took on the role as Manager and appointed former Woodford United and AFC Rushden & Diamonds keeper Matt Finlay as his Assistant. Pete Harris joined as Coach and Andy Emery was announced as Reserve Team Manager.

2018–19 saw Arron Parkinson lead the club to the double by winning the UCL Premier Division and the UCL Knock Out Cup.

In 2019–20, the club returned to the Southern League, however, the COVID-19 Pandemic meant that they would not complete this or the 2020–21 season.

Sadly during this time, the Town lost three members of the Hobbs family in quick session. Club President, Frank Hobbs died just two weeks after his wife Sarah. Frank's younger brother, Malcolm Hobbs died just three months later. Between them, they had covered just about every position within the club and had given almost 200 years of combined service to the Town.

In 2021–22, the club moved to the  ending the season in 16th place in the table.  Off the pitch, Chairman Steve Tubb was joined by Derren Midson with the two becoming co-chairmen.  This reverted to Steve Tubb as sole chairman at the end of the season as Midson reverted to his role as Junior Chairman.

The club also started a third male adult team playing in the Northants Combination League Division 3. This team was called Daventry Town Hobbs.
The club also started a third male adult team playing in the Northants Combination League Division 3. This team was named Daventry Town Hobbs.

In 2021–22, the club moved to the Northern Premier League Midlands Division ending the season in 16th place but 15 points clear of the relegation spots.

Off the pitch, the club announced that it was debt free.

Prior to the 2022/23 season, the club also started up an u18s side playing in the Northants Senior Youth League and Daventry Town Sundays team playing in the Rugby and District Sunday League. The club also confirmed that a record 39 Junior teams would be playing in various local leagues.

Current squad

Club honours
Northampton Town League Division One
Winners: 1975–76
Northants Combination League Division One
Winners: 1987–88
Northants Combination League Premier Division
Winners: 1988–89
Northants Combination League Knock Out Cup
Winners: 1987–88
United Counties League Division One
Winners: 1989–90, 1990–91, 2000–01, 2007–08, 2016–17
United Counties League Premier Division
Winners: 2009–10, 2018–19
United Counties Knock Out Cup
Runners Up: 2007–08
Winners: 2018–19
Northamptonshire FA / Junior Cup
Winners: 1930–31
Winners: 1960–61
Northamptonshire FA / Lower Junior Cup
Winners: 1990-91
Runners Up: 1988–99
Northamptonshire FA / Hillier Cup
Winners: 2013–14
Runners Up: 2007–08, 2012–13
Finalist: 2019–20 Final v Kettering Town not played due to COVID-19
Daventry Charity Cup
Winners: 1997–98, 1999-2000
Buckingham Charity Cup
Winners: 2017–18
Taygold Cup
Winners: 1988–89

Club records

Highest League Position: 3rd in Southern League Division One Central 2010–11
F.A Cup best Performance: First round proper 2013–14
F.A. Trophy best performance: First round proper 2013–14
F.A. Vase best performance: Fifth round 2009–10

Season-by-season record since 1989

Key – Ex Pre = Extra Preliminary Round, Pre = Preliminary Round, 2 QR = Second Round Qualifying, R 1 = First Round, R 2 = Second Round, R 3 = Third Round

Source: Football Club History Database

Former players
1. Players that have played/managed in the football league or any foreign equivalent to this level (i.e. fully professional league).

 David Bevan
 Liam Dolman
 Warren Donald
 Howard Forinton
 Lee Hendrie
 Stuart Hendrie
 Bert Howe
 Mark Kinsella
 George Thomson
 Paul Lamb
 Michael Bryan
 Dior Angus
 Tom TJ James
 Melanius Mullarkey
 Miles Welch-Hayes
 Robbie Cundy
 Joe Henderson
 Jack Finch

2. Players that hold a club record or have captained the club.

 Liam Dolman
 Ash Deeney
 Ricky Hill
 Ross Harris

References

External links
 Official Website
 Daventry Town on Football Club History Database

Football clubs in England
Daventry
Association football clubs established in 1886
United Counties League
Southern Football League clubs
Football clubs in Northamptonshire
1886 establishments in England
Northern Premier League clubs